Paul van Schalen (born 25 February 1972 in Heeze) is a Dutch former professional racing cyclist.

Major results

 1998
 1st Stage 1 Thüringen Rundfahrt der U23
 1st Prologue Olympia's Tour
 1st Stage 4 Ster der Beloften
 2nd Ronde van Drenthe
 3rd Ster van Zwolle
2000
 1st Ster van Zwolle
2002
 3rd National Time Trial Championships
2005
 1st Veenendaal–Veenendaal
 1st Ronde van Noord-Holland
2007
 1st Stage 9 Olympia's Tour
 1st Stage 1 OZ Wielerweekend

References

1972 births
Living people
Dutch male cyclists
Sportspeople from Heeze-Leende
Cyclists from North Brabant